Hoseynabad-e Hafashlu (also Romanized as Ḩoseynābād-e Hafashlū and Ḩoseynābād-e Hapeshlū; also known as Habeshlī, Habishi, and Habishli) is a village in Akhtarabad Rural District, in the Central District of Malard County, Tehran Province, Iran. At the 2006 census, its population was 67, in 15 families.

References 

Populated places in Malard County